Orpheus Descending is a three-act play by Tennessee Williams. It was first presented on Broadway  on March 17, 1957 but had only a brief run (68 performances) and modest success. It was revived on Broadway in 1989, directed by Peter Hall and starring Vanessa Redgrave and Kevin Anderson. The production ran for 13 previews and 97 performances.

The play is a rewrite of an earlier play by Williams called Battle of Angels, which was written in 1940. Williams wrote the character of Myra Torrance for Tallulah Bankhead, but she turned down the role, saying "The play is impossible, darling, but sit down and have a drink with me." The production previewed in Boston the same year, starring Miriam Hopkins. It was the first produced play written by Williams and by his account it "failed spectacularly". At one point, Boston's city censors and the City Council threatened to shut down the production over its "lascivious and immoral" language.  Battle of Angels remained un-produced in New York for 34 years, until the Circle Repertory Company opened their sixth season with it in 1974, directed by Marshall W. Mason.

Williams was rewriting Battle of Angels by 1951. When Orpheus Descending appeared in 1957, Williams wrote: "On the surface it was and still is the tale of a wild-spirited boy who wanders into a conventional community of the South and creates the commotion of a fox in a chicken coop. But beneath that now familiar surface it is a play about unanswered questions that haunt the hearts of people and the difference between continuing to ask them...and the acceptance of prescribed answers that are not answers at all."

Description 
The play is a modern retelling of the ancient Greek Orpheus legend and deals, in the most elemental fashion, with the power of passion, art, and imagination to redeem and revitalize life, giving it new meaning. The story is set in a dry goods store in a small southern town marked, in the play, by conformity, sexual frustration, narrowness, and racism. Into this scene steps Val, a young man with a guitar, a snakeskin jacket, a questionable past, and undeniable animal-erotic energy and appeal. He gets a job in the dry goods store run by a middle-aged woman named Lady, whose elderly husband is dying. Lady has a past and passions of her own. She finds herself attracted to Val and to the possibility of new life he seems to offer. It is a tempting antidote to her loveless marriage and boring, small-town life. The play describes the awakening of passion, love, and life – as well as its tragic consequences for Val and Lady.

The play deals with passion, its repression and its attempted recovery. On another level, it is also about trying to live bravely and honestly in a fallen world. The play is replete with lush, poetic dialogue and imagery. On the stage, the opening sections seem somewhat lacking in dramatic movement, but the play picks up power as the characters are developed and it moves to its climax. Val, representing Orpheus, represents the forces of energy and eros, which, buried as they are in compromise and everyday mundanity, have the tragic power to create life anew.

Plot 
Dolly and Beulah, two gossiping housewives, tell each other that Jabe Torrance has just had surgery in Memphis but is dying. Carol Cutrere comes in a little later and Val, a roaming singer and musician, comes into the general store. Carol flirts with Val, insisting she has met him before in New Orleans, but he denies any prior knowledge of her. Lady agrees to hire Val as a clerk.

After a few weeks, Val tells Lady about his wild past in New Orleans and admits that he once knew Carol. When David enters the store, Lady tells David that she aborted his child when he left her. Val and Vee are talking about her painting when Vee's husband, Talbot, catches him kissing her hand. Lady allows Val to stay at the store, but Val steals money from the cashbox when she leaves to get linens for the bed. Val returns the money and wants to leave, but Lady begs him to stay.

On Easter, Jabe tells Lady he was responsible for her father's death and has a hemorrhage. At sunset, Vee says she has been blinded by a vision of the risen Christ and Val is yelled at by Vee's husband for helping her up. Vee's husband, Sheriff Talbot, tells him he has until sunset to get out of town. Val is ready to leave but Lady tries to stop him. She tries to get the nurse to kill her husband with a lethal dose of morphine, but the nurse will not. Then Lady tells Val she is happily pregnant with his child, and tells Val she looks forward to a new life because of this.

Both walk about the newly decorated refreshment emporium adjoining the store, symbolizing the promise of a new start. As Val and Lady embrace, Val looks up to see that Jabe has torn a hole through his floor, and thus through the ceiling of the emporium, and is throwing coal oil into the place, setting it on fire while yelling out the upstairs window that Val has set the place on fire and is "robbing the place." Lady escapes through the door of the emporium and heads up the stairs towards Jabe's room yelling "No Jabe, no!" whereupon Jabe shoots Lady on the stairway. As Lady dies, the local sheriff and fire squad break through the front door, and seeing Val trying to get out of the emporium, open their water hoses full force in an ultimately successful attempt to push him back into the burning building, thus murdering him. Lady calls out for him while dying from her husband Jabe's gunshots.

In the final scene, Carol walks in the remains of the burnt-out emporium while another transient looks about and discovers Val's snakeskin jacket. Carol trades a gold ring for the jacket and offers a soliloquy on "the fugitive kind."

Adaptations 
In 1959, a screen adaptation starring Marlon Brando and Anna Magnani appeared under the title The Fugitive Kind; it was directed by Sidney Lumet, and flopped like the stage production. Orpheus Descending, a more faithful version – a film adaptation of the Peter Hall stage production – was released in 1990, starring Vanessa Redgrave. The play was also adapted as a two-act opera by Bruce Saylor and J.D. McClatchy in 1994.

See also 
 Southern Gothic

References

External links 
 

1957 plays
Plays by Tennessee Williams
Plays set in the United States
Southern United States in fiction
American plays adapted into films
Orpheus
Plays adapted into operas
New Directions Publishing books